The Boulton Paul P.115 and Boulton Paul P.116 were basic trainers designed by Boulton Paul Aircraft to meet Air Ministry Specification T.16/48.

Variants
Data from:Boulton Paul aircraft since 1915
P.115Designed to Spec T.16/48, the P.115 was to have been powered by an Armstrong Siddeley Cheetah seven-cylinder radial engine, to replace the Percival Prentice.

P.116Boulton Paul also submitted the P.116 for T.16/48, powered by a supercharged  de Havilland Gipsy Queen 50.

The Percival Provost won the order for trainers to spec. T.16/48, after competitive trials with the Handley Page H.P.R.2

Specifications (P.116 estimated)

See also

References

P.116
1940s British military trainer aircraft
Cancelled military aircraft projects of the United Kingdom